Pyrrolidinylthiambutene is an opioid analgesic drug from the thiambutene family with around 3/4 of the potency of morphine. It would be considered an illegal controlled substance analogue in some countries such as the US, Australia and New Zealand, but is legal in countries not possessing a controlled-substances-analog-act equivalent.

References 

Opioids
Thiophenes
Pyrrolidines
Mu-opioid receptor agonists